A Heinrich event is a natural phenomenon in which large groups of icebergs break off from the Laurentide Ice Sheet and traverse the Hudson Strait into the North Atlantic. First described by marine geologist Hartmut Heinrich, they occurred during five of the last seven glacial periods over the past 640,000 years. Heinrich events are particularly well documented for the last glacial period but notably absent from the penultimate glaciation. The icebergs contained rock mass that had been eroded by the glaciers, and as they melted, this material was dropped to the sea floor as ice rafted debris (abbreviated to "IRD") forming deposits called Heinrich layers.

The icebergs' melting caused vast quantities of fresh water to be added to the North Atlantic. Such inputs of cold and fresh water may well have altered the density-driven, thermohaline circulation patterns of the ocean, and often coincide with indications of global climate fluctuations.

Various mechanisms have been proposed to explain the cause of Heinrich events, most of which imply instability of the massive Laurentide Ice Sheet, a continental ice sheet covering most of northeastern North America during the last glacial period. Other northern hemisphere ice sheets were potentially involved as well, such as the (Fennoscandic and Iceland/Greenland). However, the initial cause of this instability is still debated.

Description 
The strict definition of Heinrich events is the climatic event causing the IRD layer observed in marine sediment cores from the North Atlantic: a massive collapse of northern hemisphere ice shelves and the consequent release of a prodigious volume of icebergs. By extension, the name "Heinrich event" can also refer to the associated climatic anomalies registered at other places around the globe, at approximately the same time periods. The events are rapid: they last probably less than a millennium, a duration varying from one event to the next, and their abrupt onset may occur in mere years. Heinrich events are clearly observed in many North Atlantic marine sediment cores covering the last glacial period; the lower resolution of the sedimentary record before this point makes it more difficult to deduce whether they occurred during other glacial periods in the Earth's history. Some researchers identify the Younger Dryas event as a Heinrich event, which would make it event H0 (table, right).

Heinrich events appear related to some, but not all, of the cold periods preceding the rapid warming events known as Dansgaard-Oeschger (D-O) events, which are best recorded in the NGRIP Greenland ice core. However, difficulties in synchronising marine sediment cores and Greenland ice cores to the same time scale raised questions as to the accuracy of that statement.

Potential climatic fingerprint of Heinrich events 
Heinrich's original observations were of six layers in ocean sediment cores with extremely high proportions of rocks of continental origin, "lithic fragments", in the 180 μm to  size range. The larger size fractions cannot be transported by ocean currents, and are thus interpreted as having been carried by icebergs or sea ice which broke off glaciers or ice shelves, and dumped debris onto the sea floor as the icebergs melted. Geochemical analyses of the IRD can provide information about the origin of these debris: mostly the large Laurentide Ice Sheet then covering North America for Heinrich events 1, 2, 4 and 5, and on the contrary, European ice sheets for the minor events 3 and 6. The signature of the events in sediment cores varies considerably with distance from the source region. For events of Laurentide origin, there is a belt of IRD at around 50° N, known as the Ruddiman belt, expanding some 3,000 km (1,865 mi) from its North American source towards Europe, and thinning by an order of magnitude from the Labrador Sea to the European end of the present iceberg route (Grousset et al., 1993). During Heinrich events, huge volumes of fresh water flow into the ocean.

Several geological indicators fluctuate approximately in time with these Heinrich events, but difficulties in precise dating and correlation make it difficult to tell whether the indicators precede or lag Heinrich events, or in some cases whether they are related at all. Heinrich events are often marked by the following changes:

 Increased δ18O of the northern (Nordic) seas and East Asian stalactites (speleothems), which by proxy suggests falling global temperature (or rising ice volume)
 Decreased oceanic salinity, due to the influx of fresh water
 Decreased sea surface temperature estimates off the West African coast through biochemical indicators known as alkenones (Sachs 2005)
 Warming of the subsurface ocean in the subpolar North Atlantic
 Changes in sedimentary disturbance (bioturbation) caused by burrowing animals
 Flux in planktonic isotopic make-up (changes in δ13C, decreased δ18O)
 Pollen indications of cold-loving pines replacing oaks on the North American mainland (Grimm et al. 1993)
 Decreased foramaniferal abundance – which due to the pristine nature of many samples cannot be attributed to preservational bias and has been related to reduced salinity
 Increased terrigenous runoff from the continents, measured near the mouth of the Amazon River
 Increased grain size in wind-blown loess in China, suggesting stronger winds
 Changes in relative Thorium-230 abundance, reflecting variations in ocean current velocity
 Increased deposition rates in the northern Atlantic, reflected by an increase in continentally derived sediments (lithics) relative to background sedimentation
 Expansion of grass and shrubland across large areas of Europe

The global extent of these records illustrates the dramatic impact of Heinrich events.

Unusual Heinrich events 

H3 and H6 do not share such a convincing suite of Heinrich event symptoms as events H1, H2, H4, and H5, which has led some researchers to suggest that they are not true Heinrich events. That would make Gerard C. Bond's suggestion of Heinrich events fitting into a 7,000-year cycle ("Bond events") suspect.

Several lines of evidence suggest that H3 and H6 were somehow different from the other events.
 Lithic peaks: a far smaller proportion of lithics (3,000 vs. 6,000 grains per gram) is observed in H3 and H6, which means that the role of the continents in providing sediments to the oceans was relatively lower.
 Foram dissolution: Foraminifera tests appear to be more eroded during H3 and H6 (Gwiazda et al., 1996). That may indicate an influx of nutrient-rich, hence corrosive, Antarctic Bottom Water by a reconfiguration of oceanic circulation patterns.
 Ice provenance: Icebergs in H1, H2, H4, and H5 are relatively enriched in Paleozoic "detrital carbonate" originating from the Hudson Strait region; while H3 and H6 icebergs carried less of this distinctive material
 Ice rafted debris distribution: Sediment transported by ice does not extend as far East during H3/6. Hence some researchers have been moved to suggest a European origin for at least some H3/6 clasts: America and Europe were originally adjacent to one another; hence, the rocks on each continent are difficult to distinguish, and the source is open to interpretation.

Causes 

As with so many climate related issues, the system is far too complex to be confidently assigned to a single cause. There are several possible drivers, which fall into two categories.

Internal forcings—the "binge–purge" model 
This model suggests that factors internal to ice sheets cause the periodic disintegration of major ice volumes, responsible for Heinrich events.

The gradual accumulation of ice on the Laurentide Ice Sheet led to a gradual increase in its mass, as the "binge phase". Once the sheet reached a critical mass, the soft, unconsolidated sub-glacial sediment formed a "slippery lubricant" over which the ice sheet slid, in the "purge phase", lasting around 750 years. The original model proposed that geothermal heat caused the sub-glacial sediment to thaw once the ice volume was large enough to prevent the escape of heat into the atmosphere. 

The mathematics of the system are consistent with a 7,000-year periodicity, similar to that observed if H3 and H6 are indeed Heinrich events. However, if H3 and H6 are not Heinrich events, the Binge-Purge model loses credibility, as the predicted periodicity is key to its assumptions.
It may also appear suspect because similar events are not observed in other ice ages, although this may be due to the lack of high-resolution sediments.
In addition, the model predicts that the reduced size of ice sheets during the Pleistocene should reduce the size, impact and frequency of Heinrich events, which is not reflected by the evidence.

External forcings 
Several factors external to ice sheets may cause Heinrich events, but such factors would have to be large to overcome attenuation by the huge volumes of ice involved.

Gerard Bond suggests that changes in the flux of solar energy on a 1,500-year scale may be correlated to the Dansgaard-Oeschger cycles, and in turn the Heinrich events; however the small magnitude of the change in energy makes such an exo-terrestrial factor unlikely to have the required large effects, at least without huge positive feedback processes acting within the Earth system. However, rather than the warming itself melting the ice, it is possible that sea-level change associated with the warming destabilised ice shelves. A rise in sea level could begin to corrode the bottom of an ice sheet, undercutting it; when one ice sheet failed and surged, the ice released would further raise sea levels, and further destabilizing other ice sheets. In favour of this theory is the non-simultaneity of ice sheet break-up in H1, H2, H4, and H5, where European breakup preceded European melting by up to 1,500 years.

The Atlantic Heat Piracy model suggests that changes in oceanic circulation cause one hemisphere's oceans to become warmer at the other's expense. Currently, the Gulf Stream redirects warm, equatorial waters towards the northern Nordic Seas. The addition of fresh water to northern oceans may reduce the strength of the Gulf stream, and allow a southwards current to develop instead. This would cause the cooling of the northern hemisphere, and the warming of the southern, causing changes in ice accumulation and melting rates and possibly triggering shelf destruction and Heinrich events.

Rohling's 2004 Bipolar model suggests that sea level rise lifted buoyant ice shelves, causing their destabilisation and destruction. Without a floating ice shelf to support them, continental ice sheets would flow out towards the oceans and disintegrate into icebergs and sea ice.

Freshwater addition has been implicated by coupled ocean and atmosphere climate modeling, showing that both Heinrich and Dansgaard-Oeschger events may show hysteresis behaviour. This means that relatively minor changes in freshwater loading into the Nordic Seas, such as a 0.15 Sv increase or 0.03 Sv decrease, would suffice to cause profound shifts in global circulation. The results show that a Heinrich event does not cause a cooling around Greenland but further south, mostly in the subtropical Atlantic, a finding supported by most available paleoclimatic data. This idea was connected to D-O events by Maslin et al. (2001). They suggested that each ice sheet had its own conditions of stability, but that on melting, the influx of freshwater was enough to reconfigure ocean currents, and cause melting elsewhere. More specifically, D-O cold events, and their associated influx of meltwater, reduce the strength of the North Atlantic Deep Water current (NADW), weakening the northern-hemisphere circulation and therefore resulting in an increased transfer of heat polewards in the southern hemisphere. This warmer water results in melting of Antarctic ice, thereby reducing density stratification and the strength of the Antarctic Bottom Water current (AABW). This allows the NADW to return to its previous strength, driving northern hemisphere melting and another D-O cold event. Eventually, the accumulation of melting reaches a threshold, whereby it raises sea level enough to undercut the Laurentide Ice Sheet, thereby causing a Heinrich event and resetting the cycle.

Hunt & Malin (1998) proposed that Heinrich events are caused by earthquakes triggered near the ice margin by rapid deglaciation.

See also 
 Ice sheet dynamics
 Bond event

References

Further reading 
 2011 summary of recent work:

External links 
 William C. Calvin, "The great climate flip-flop" adapted from Atlantic Monthly, 281(1):47–64 (January 1998).
 (Gerald Bond) "Recent, Abrupt Climate-Cooling Cycle Found": Columbia University Press Release, December 11, 1995:
 IPCC TAR section 2.4.3 How Fast did Climate Change during the Glacial Period?

Paleoclimatology
Historical geology
Pleistocene events
Geology of the Atlantic Ocean
Icebergs
1988 in science